Tamsin West (born 7 March 1974) is an Australian child actress and singer. She made her film debut as Jennifer West in Jenny Kissed Me and played Jane Cannon in Frog Dreaming. She is perhaps best known to television viewers as Linda Twist, a role during the first series in the children's television show Round the Twist. West was the first actress of three to portray the role.

As well as appearing in children's television, West also appeared in Neighbours as Emma Gordon, between 1987 and 1988, and again in 1991, and guested on Blue Heelers. She was in the chorus for the 1992 Jesus Christ Superstar Australian arena production.

West performed the lead vocals on the Round the Twist theme song. This was used for all four series despite the fact that she only appeared as an actress in the first series.

Filmography

External links 

1974 births
Living people
Australian television actresses
Australian child actresses
People educated at the Presbyterian Ladies' College, Melbourne
Actresses from Melbourne